Leonardo Conti (24 August 1900 – 6 October 1945) was the Reich Health Leader in Nazi Germany. The murder of many Germans who were of "unsound mind" is attributed to his leadership. On 19 May 1945, after Germany's surrender, Conti was imprisoned and in October hanged himself to avoid trial.

Early life
Conti was born to a Swiss Italian father, Silvio, and a German mother, Nanna Pauli; his mother later became the Reich Midwifery Leader in Nazi Germany. 

Conti later studied medicine at the Humboldt University of Berlin and the University of Erlangen–Nuremberg. He became active in the völkisch movement and the Viking League, and co-founded an antisemitic paper called Kampfbund ("Struggle league"). He took part in the Kapp Putsch in 1920. From 1923 he was a member of the Sturmabteilung (SA), becoming their first physician; one of his patients was Horst Wessel, who, after being killed in a street shootout with German communists, became a martyr of the Nazi Party. In 1925, he promoted "Über Weichteilplastik im Gesicht", a book about facial plastic surgery. He was an organizer of the National Socialist German Doctors' League.

Nazi doctor
He joined the SS and, as an "old fighter" of the party, he was appointed by Hermann Göring to the Prussian Legislature. Conti held the posts and titles of Head of the Reich Physicians' Chamber (Reichsärztekammer), Leader of the NSDÄB, and Leader of the Main Office for the People's Health. In 1937 he was elected to the presidency of the FIMS, the International Federation of Sports Medicine. The FIMS today considers this to have been "a black page' in their history. In 1939, Conti was appointed Reich Health Leader and State Secretary for the Health in the Reich by Adolf Hitler. On 1 July 1941, as the Chief of Health in the Reich, he obtained the classification of Pervitin (see History and culture of substituted amphetamines) among the products defined by Reich law on opiates. It condemns the private use of Pervitin, but does not call into question its use for military purposes. He obtained the rank of SS-Obergruppenführer (lieutenant general).

Action T4

Leonardo Conti was a staunch promoter of a public medical administration strongly controlled by the Nazi state. Under his leadership, local health offices were further expanded to allow for a genetic control and selection of the population in order to remove "weak" elements for the improvement of the German race, a doctrine known as eugenics. The various programmes were the basis for "racial hygiene" a lethal part of the Nazi philosophy.
 
Accordingly, he was co-responsible for the forced sterilization program, the racially motivated forced pregnancy interruptions, and ultimately the Action T4 program. It is also undisputed that Conti participated in human experiments. Conti was also involved in the forensic investigation into the Katyn massacre, and received a detailed report, known as the Katyn Commission on the discovery from an international team of experts.

Post-war imprisonment and suicide
On 19 May 1945, after Germany's surrender, Conti was imprisoned and would have been brought to the Doctors' Trial for his involvement in Action T4. However, on 6 October 1945, over a year before the trial began, Conti hanged himself in his Nuremberg cell.

See also
List SS-Obergruppenführer

References

Bibliography

External links 
 
 Biography of Leonardo Conti 
  (in German).
 

1900 births
1945 suicides
Holocaust perpetrators in Germany
People from Lugano
German Völkisch Freedom Party politicians
Nazi Party politicians
Members of the Reichstag of Nazi Germany
Nazi Party officials
Organisation Consul members
Aktion T4 personnel
Physicians in the Nazi Party
Swiss Nazis
Nazis who committed suicide in prison custody
Prisoners who died in United States military detention
Nazi human subject research
SS-Obergruppenführer
Sturmabteilung personnel
Nazis who committed suicide in Germany
Suicides by hanging in Germany
Kapp Putsch participants
20th-century Freikorps personnel
German eugenicists
1945 deaths